Pasil (also Romanized as Pasīl; also known as Pasīr) is a village in Sepiddasht Rural District, Papi District, Khorramabad County, Lorestan Province, Iran. At the 2006 census, its population was 469, in 92 families.

References 

Towns and villages in Khorramabad County